GOTR may refer to:

 Girls on the Run, a girl-oriented American NGO
 Ghost of the Robot, an American band based in California